Ancylosis ochricostella is a species of snout moth in the genus Ancylosis. It was described by Ragonot in 1887, and is known from Turkmenistan and Turkey.

References

Moths described in 1887
ochricostella
Moths of Asia